Zhang Xiaoye (born June 1963) is a Chinese meteorologist who is a researcher and doctoral supervisor at the Chinese Academy of Meteorological Sciences.

Biography
Zhang was born in Beijing, in June 1963. He obtained his Bachelor of Science degree from Northwest University (China) in 1986 and his Doctor of Science degree from Nanjing University in 1995. In April of that same year, he became a researcher at the Chinese Academy of Sciences (CAS). He was a visiting scholar at the University of Rhode Island, University of Hawaii, and University of New Mexico. He once served as deputy director of Institute of Earth Environment, Chinese Academy of Sciences and vice-president of Chinese Academy of Meteorological Sciences.

Honours and awards
 1998 National Science Fund for Distinguished Young Scholars
 2001 National Science Fund for Distinguished Young Scholars
 November 22, 2019 Member of the Chinese Academy of Engineering (CAE)

References

1963 births
Living people
Engineers from Beijing
Chinese meteorologists
Northwest University (China) alumni
Nanjing University alumni
Members of the Chinese Academy of Engineering